Kalmat Naval Base is a proposed naval base of the Pakistan Navy at Khor Kalmat, Balochistan, Pakistan.

Location
Khor Kalmat is a lagoon located on the Makran coast of Balochistan. The Basol River drains into the Khor Kalmat lagoon. The geographical coordinates of Khor Kalmat are N 25° 24' 32 E 64° 4' 37.

See also 
 Jinnah Naval Base
 PNS Ahsan
 PNS Makran
 PNS Mehran
 PNS Qasim
 Karachi Naval Dockyard
 Karachi Shipyard

References

Pakistan Navy bases
Gwadar District
Military installations in Balochistan, Pakistan